Sokoline is a village in the Kotor Varoš municipality in north-central Bosnia and Herzegovina. According to the 2013 preliminary census, there were 5 inhabitants.

The village is situated by the Jakotina river, on opposite side of the river from Jakotina.

Demographics 
1961 = 350

References

External links
 Maplandia

Populated places in Kotor Varoš
Villages in Bosnia and Herzegovina